Chak no 114/12-L (Bahadur Shah Wala or Kassowal) is a village of Chichawatni Tehsil in Sahiwal District, Punjab, Pakistan. The village is located at 30°28'01.3" North and 72°36'04.5" East. 
This village is situated at a distance of 4.5 kilometers from N5 National Highway (Lahore-Multan Section) near Pakistan second national forest (the forest of chichawatni). Chak no 114/12-L is 9 km from Kassowal and 15 km from Chichawatni.

Castes and tribes 
Tribes of this village includes Bukhari Sadaat, Baloch, Borana, [Saroya],Araain  Ambalia , Saroya, Bajwa, Dhilon, Bhatti(Rajput), Dogar, Bhojye, Lille, khokhar, Boht and the most hard working Musalli.

References

External links 

Populated places in Sahiwal District